Plautia affinis is a species of stink bug found mainly in Queensland and New South Wales, Australia. It was first described in 1851 as Pentatoma affinis by William Sweetland Dallas. It is small, bright green and has brown hemelytra.

Range
Plautia affinis is found in all states and territories of Australia.

References

Pentatominae
Insects of Queensland
Insects of Australia
Taxa named by William Dallas